Old Bridge, also known as the Historic Village of Old Bridge, is an unincorporated community and census-designated place (CDP) located within East Brunswick in Middlesex County, in the U.S. state of New Jersey. It is on the South River, a tributary of the Raritan River. The community is named after the first bridge built here to cross the river, the South River Bridge. After other bridges were built crossing the river, it became known as the Old Bridge. The Old Bridge Historic District, encompassing much of the village, is listed on the state and national registers of historic places.

History
Located at the head of navigation of the South River, Old Bridge was at the junction of several trade routes. Settlers came to area as early as 1685. The Bordentown and South Amboy Turnpike, a stagecoach route, went through here in 1740. A freight station was built in 1832 on the Camden and Amboy Railroad, which ran through the community. It had a tavern and several houses. On August 9, 1853, there was a major head-on collision between two trains near the station, resulting in several deaths.  From  to 1921, the Brookfield Glass Company operated a plant here producing bottles and jars.

Historic district

The Old Bridge Historic District is a  historic district located along several streets in the community. It was added to the National Register of Historic Places on June 29, 1977 for its significance in art, education, and industry. The district includes 78 contributing buildings.

The Old Bridge Baptist Church at 21 Kossman Street was built in 1844 and features a gothic arched double door entrance. It was originally known as the Independent Bethel Baptist Church of Washington and Herbertsville. The Simpson Methodist Episcopal Church at 16 Maple Street was built in 1860 and named after Bishop Matthew Simpson. It was purchased in 1977 by the township to be used as the East Brunswick Museum. General Obadiah Herbert (1775–1856), businessman and entrepreneur, lived at 146 Main Street, starting in 1810. For a while, the village was known as Herbertsville in his honor. His son, Jacob V. W. Herbert (1812–1899), was elected to the New Jersey General Assembly representing Monmouth County in 1855. The Alice Appleby Devoe Memorial Library is located at 166 Main Street.

Transportation

There are several main roads in the community. County Route 527 (Old Bridge Turnpike, Old Bridge–Matawan Road) runs north-south and intersects with County Route 615 (Main Street), which runs east-west. County Route 677 (River Road) runs north from CR 615 near the South River. New Jersey Route 18 can be accessed from CR 615.

Points of interest
Located to the north on Old Bridge Turnpike, the nearby Chestnut Hill Cemetery, also known as the Old Bridge Cemetery, has the remains of many of the families from the community. Tours of the cemetery have been organized by the New Jersey Cultural Alliance.

South of Main Street and along the South River, Keystone Park offers hiking and natural areas.

Notable people
People who were born in, residents of, or otherwise closely associated with Old Bridge include:
 T. Frank Appleby (1864–1924), politician
 George Brasno (1911–1982), vaudevillian performer
 Olive Brasno (1917–1998), vaudevillian performer, sister of George
 James Crawford Thom (1835–1898), artist, painter
 Henrietta Christian Wright (1854–1899), author of books for children on literature, history and science

See also
 National Register of Historic Places listings in Middlesex County, New Jersey
 List of museums in New Jersey
 List of turnpikes in New Jersey

References

External links
 
 

East Brunswick, New Jersey
Census-designated places in Middlesex County, New Jersey
Census-designated places in New Jersey
Unincorporated communities in Middlesex County, New Jersey
Unincorporated communities in New Jersey